Mount Bradley is a summit in Inyo and Tulare counties, California, in the United States and is in the Kings Canyon National Park.

Mount Bradley was named for Cornelius B. Bradley, a  professor at the University of California.

References

Mountains of Inyo County, California
Mountains of Tulare County, California
Mountains of Northern California